Damon Vignale is a Canadian writer, director, and producer working in film and television. He has directed the films Little Brother of War and The Entrance. He released the web series The Vetala in 2009, drawn from the Baital Pachisi, a collection of Sanskrit tales and legends, which received a 2010 Gemini Award. Vignale’s debut documentary film The Exhibition world premiered in the Next Program of the 2013 Hot Docs International Film Festival. The film won the 2014 International Emmy Award for Arts Programming. Vignale's television credits as a writer-producer include ABC/CTV's homicide series Motive, Bravo's police drama 19-2, and the ITV/BritBox series The Bletchley Circle: San Francisco.

Vignale was creator and showrunner of the original crime-drama series The Murders for City TV. The series starred Jessica Lucas as a rookie homicide detective whose negligence in a fellow officer’s death has her searching for redemption in her investigations. Rogers Media announced production commencing October 9, 2018 The series premiered in Canada and Europe in 2019. Sundance Now released the series in the US in 2021.

Filmography

Awards

2015 Academy of Canadian Cinema and Television Diversity Award
2014 International Emmy Award
2014 Leo Award - Best Direction in a Documentary 
2014 Leo Award - Best Editing in a Documentary
2014 The PBS Michael Sullivan FRONTLINE Award for Journalism in a Documentary
2012 Leo Award - Best Dramatic Series
2011 Leo Award - Best Screenwriting in a Dramatic Series
2010 Gemini Award - Best Original Program/Digital Media Fiction
2010 Leo Award - Best Web Series
2010 Webby Award Honoree - Drama
2010 Silver Telly Award
2004 Audience Award - Toronto Reelworld Film Festival

References

External links 

The Exhibition Official Website

Canadian television writers
Canadian documentary film directors
Canadian male screenwriters
Living people
Year of birth missing (living people)
Canadian television directors
Canadian television producers
20th-century Canadian screenwriters
20th-century Canadian male writers
21st-century Canadian screenwriters
21st-century Canadian male writers